Johannes Gideon Andries Jonker (born 22 August 1994 in East London, South Africa) is a South African rugby union player for the  in Super Rugby, the  in the Currie Cup and the  in the Rugby Challenge. His regular position is prop.

Career

Youth

Jonker was selected to represent Border in several youth tournaments. In 2007, he played for them in the Under-13 Craven Week competition, in 2010 he played at the Under-16 Grant Khomo Week and in 2012 he played at the Under-18 Craven Week competition.

He subsequently joined their academy and played for the  side in the 2012 and the 2013 Under-19 Provincial Championships. He helped them win promotion from Division B to Division A in 2012, but was also part of the side that got relegated back to Division B in 2013.

Border Bulldogs

His first class debut came during the 2014 Vodacom Cup competition. With the Border Rugby Football Union in financial strife, they only had eleven contracted players on their books and gave opportunities to some of their academy players, with Jonker being one of those.

His performances in that competition also led to his inclusion in the  squad for the 2014 Currie Cup qualification series and he made his Currie Cup debut in the opening match of that competition by coming on as a second-half substitute in their match against  in Kimberley.

Montpellier
In November 2017, Jonker joined French Top 14 side Montpellier Hérault Rugby as a medical joker replacement for the injured Jannie du Plessis.

References

1994 births
Living people
Bath Rugby players
Border Bulldogs players
Ealing Trailfinders Rugby Club players
Golden Lions players
Lions (United Rugby Championship) players
Montpellier Hérault Rugby players
Rugby union players from East London, Eastern Cape
Rugby union props
South African rugby union players